The Catholic Channel is a Roman Catholic lifestyle radio station on Sirius XM Satellite Radio (Channel 129) and is operated by the Archdiocese of New York. It carries daily and Sunday Mass live from St. Patrick's Cathedral, New York, NY, as well as talk shows, educational programming and a small amount of music. An additional Sunday Mass, live from the Cathedral of Our Lady of the Angels, Los Angeles, CA, was added in 2018.

This channel also broadcasts University of Notre Dame football games.

Most of the programming consists of call-in talk shows hosted by Roman Catholic personalities, such as The Busted Halo Show, featuring a Catholic priest with the Paulist Fathers. Catholic doctrine and lifestyle is discussed, such as current events, political issues, comedy, psychological issues, family life, among other things. Cardinal Timothy M. Dolan, Archbishop of New York, co-hosts a one-hour weekly program.

Background
The Catholic Channel was founded by Cardinal Edward Egan, Archbishop Emeritus of New York, in 2006. The intention of the channel is to discuss Catholicism in a nontraditional manner, serving as an alternative to other Catholic media programs like EWTN. It began broadcasting on Sirius Satellite Radio channel 159 on December 4, 2006. Initial personalities still on the air include Lino Rulli, producer and former television host, Gus Lloyd, radio veteran, and Father Dave Dwyer, ordained priest. Cardinal Edward Egan also hosted a show, A Conversation with the Cardinal, before being replaced in 2009 (due to his retirement) by the current Cardinal Archbishop of New York, Timothy M. Dolan.

The Catholic Channel now broadcasts on Sirius XM channel 129.

Programming

Daily shows
The Katie McGrady Show with Katie McGrady
The Busted Halo Show with Father Dave Dwyer
The Catholic Guy Show with Lino Rulli
Seize the Day with Gus Lloyd

Weekly shows
• America this week by the America Media Staff
Conversation with Cardinal Dolan with Cardinal Timothy Dolan
Pathways of Learning with Sister Marie Pappas
Word to Life with Father John Maria Devaney, O.P.

Weekend shows
Christopher Closeup with Dennis Heaney
Just Love with Msgr. Kevin Sullivan
 Pathways of Learning with Sister Marie Pappas
Personally Speaking with Msgr. Jim Lisante
Religion and Rock with Msgr. Jim Vlaun
Salt and Light Hour with Deacon Pedro Guevara Mann
Sounds from the Spires with Dr. Jennifer Pascual

See also
Roman Catholic Archdiocese of New York

References

External links
The Catholic Channel on Sirius XM Satellite Radio

Catholic radio stations
Christian radio stations in the United States
Sirius XM Radio channels
Radio stations established in 2006
Sirius Satellite Radio channels
XM Satellite Radio channels
2006 establishments in the United States